A hypocarnivore is an animal that consumes less than 30% meat for its diet, the majority of which consists of fungi, fruits, and other plant material. Examples of living hypocarnivores are the grizzly bear (Ursus horribilis),  black bear (Ursus americanus), binturong (Arctictis binturong), kinkajou (Potos flavus), and humans (Homo sapiens).

The evolutionary division of carnivory into three groups, including hypercarnivore and mesocarnivore, appears to have occurred about 40 million years ago (mya). The term hypocarnivory is used with increasing frequency in describing early Canidae evolution, and reliance upon that survival strategy has a documented history in North American Borophaginae during the Miocene (23.03 to 5.33 mya). Twenty-five species of hypocarnivore are documented as co-occurring on the North American continent 30 mya. A shift from hyper- to hypo- occurred at least three times among Oligocene and Miocene canids Oxetocyon, Phlaocyon, and Cynarctus.

Large hypocarnivores (Ursus) were rare and developed in the mid-to-late Miocene-Pliocene as Borophaginae became extinct.

Dentition 
Examination of dentition shows that post-carnassial molar volume expands with hypocarnivores while decreasing in hypercarnivores. Prohesperocyon (38 mya—33.9 mya) displayed a shift in relative proportion between slicing and grinding functions indicative of a dietary shift away from vertebrate foods to one including fruits.

See also 
List of feeding behaviours
Omnivore

Sources 

Carnivory